Descendance (Descendance Aboriginal and Torres Strait Islander Dance Theatre), previously known as the Ngaru Dancers, is an Australian Aboriginal dance company formed in 1999.

They have performed internationally and won first prize in the dance category at the first cultural Olympics, World Culture Open.

References

External links
 Descendance Aboriginal and Torres Strait Islander Dance Theatre

Australian Aboriginal culture
Dance companies in Australia